Katy Jane Carmichael (born 5 March 1970) is an English actress, director and producer. She is most known for her roles Twist Morgan in the Channel 4 sitcom Spaced, Lucy Barlow in the ITV soap Coronation Street, and Melissa Ryan in Waterloo Road. As a director-producer, her work includes the award-winning Mayday Mayday (Bristol Old Vic and St Ann's Warehouse New York).

Early life 
Born and brought up in Liverpool as the daughter of two architects, Carmichael attended Gateacre Community Comprehensive School. She did her A-levels at Liverpool College, Mossley Hill, Liverpool.

After six seasons with the National Youth Theatre, she studied for a drama, film and television degree, at Bristol University with peers Simon Pegg, Jessica Hynes, Myfanwy Moore, and had a five-year relationship with the then-unknown drama student David Walliams.

Career 
Her first professional acting role at the age of 18 was Connie in the Liverpool sitcom Bread which she filmed during her university studies. Early in her career, she teamed up with lifelong friend, future Spaced star and writer Jessica Hynes in a comedy double-act called The Liz Hurleys. After leaving university, she began a TV career with the 1950s Liverpool drama And The Beat Goes On (1994), the Galton and Simpson series with Paul Merton, Wing and a Prayer, Death Of A Salesman, and Dennis Potter's Karaoke / Cold Lazarus. She played DC Jo McMullen in Liverpool 1.

Carmichael reunited with Hynes and Pegg to play Twist Morgan in the BAFTA nominated Channel 4 sitcom Spaced. The sitcom lasted for two series. The three also previously appeared together in the short-lived sketch show Six Pairs of Pants (1995).

In 2001, Carmichael starred in her first film, Dead Babies, based on the novel by Martin Amis. She also appeared in Kenneth Branagh's comedy film In the Bleak Midwinter as mad puppetwoman and played the female lead Jane Wells in the period fantasy drama The Infinite Worlds of H. G. Wells. A variety of roles in comedy and drama followed; Hex, Scarlett, One Foot in the Grave, Clocking Off, Cutting It. In 2002, she landed the role of florist Lucy Richards in Coronation Street and was involved in the award-winning Peter Barlow bigamy storyline for two years. She went on to play Melissa Ryan (sister of headteacher Rachel
Mason) school drama Waterloo Road (2007). Carmichael played the mother in Danny Stack's short supernatural thriller Origin (2010). In 2014, she played Helen the down-trodden housewife in Jimmy McGovern's series Moving On for the BBC and was Hayley Blake, Connie Beauchamp's nemesis in Casualty (2014–15). She plays Clarity Winlove in The Living and The Dead (2015).

On stage, she played opposite Steven Berkoff in his 3 hander Sturm and Drang and Brighton Beach Scumbags at the Riverside Studios (1995), Yseult -Whitehands with Kneehigh Theatres's international hit Tristan and Yseult (2005–06) (Sydney Festival, US). Work at other theatres includes seasons at the Royal Exchange Theatre, the Liverpool Everyman, The Gate, and The Bristol Old Vic, where she met her future husband actor Tristan Sturrock in a production of The Beaux Stratagem.

In 2010, they set up Bristol based Theatre Damfino together. She has directed the company's projects to date including Mayday Mayday (Bristol Old Vic 2012) winner of the International Fringe Review award (Edinburgh 2012)  and selected to play at St Ann's Warehouse New York and Spoleto Festival USA (2013). Mayday Mayday is a drama documentary (afternoon play Radio 4 TX 1 May 2015). The Radio play won the International Third Coast award (US) was nominated for two BBC Drama awards 2016 - best sound design and finalist for best drama production.

Carmichael collaborated with Bib Gourmand winning chef Matt Williamson and Guardian food writer Claire Thomson to create the food-theatre show The Table Of Delights, which began as a gourmet tasting and performance experience for adults (Bristol Old Vic, 2013-2014). The children's version of the show premiered at The Print Room at The Old Coronet winning the Off West End award for best production for families category (2016). Carmichael is creative director of The Table of Delights online a new food entertainment website sponsored by Yeo Valley and Pukka Tea.

She directed singer and songwriter Kate Dimbleby's solo show Songbirds (Tobacco Factory, Bath Ustinov, UK Tour 2017) based on her acclaimed a cappella album.

Personal life 
Carmichael has been married to actor Tristan Sturrock since 2005. They have three children together: a son born in 2004, a daughter born in 2006, and a second daughter born in 2010. One of their daughters, Bronte Carmichael is also an actress, who is known for her role as Madeline Robin in the 2018 Disney film Christopher Robin.

Filmography

References

External links 
 
 Origin Official Site
 Theatre Damfino website
 Table of Delights online

English women comedians
Living people
1970 births
Actresses from Liverpool
English television actresses
English soap opera actresses
People from Gateacre